A diaper bank is a social institution or nonprofit organization formed for the sole purpose of providing diapers to people in poverty who do not have access to diapers. Federally funded public assistance programs do not pay for or contribute to the payment for diapers. Diaper banks accept donations and diapers to provide for either children or adults suffering from incontinence and distribute diapers to partner agencies for distribution to people in their social programs in need of diapers. In 2011, the National Diaper Bank Network was formed to help distribute diapers across the United States.

History
The idea of a diaper bank is a relatively new.  The Diaper Bank of Southern Arizona claims to be the first diaper bank  that was started in 1994 initially as a donation to the local community by a local consulting company, ReSolve, Inc., under the leadership of Hildy Gottlieb and Dimitri Petropolis.

Diapers
Non-profit organizations based in the United States
Social institutions